Spas Spasov (born 24 April 1990, in Sofia) is a Bulgarian footballer who plays as a forward.

Career
On 10 February 2018, Spasov signed with Sozopol.  He left the club at the end of the 2017–18 season.

References

External links
 
 

1990 births
Living people
Footballers from Sofia
Bulgarian footballers
Mqabba F.C. players
PFC Marek Dupnitsa players
PFC Rilski Sportist Samokov players
PFC Spartak Pleven players
FC Sozopol players
Second Professional Football League (Bulgaria) players
Bulgarian expatriate footballers
Expatriate footballers in Malta
Association football forwards